Völpke is a municipality in the Börde district in Saxony-Anhalt, Germany. Völpke has a population of 1,230 (as of 2020).

References

Municipalities in Saxony-Anhalt
Börde (district)